The Main road 46 is a north-south direction Secondary class main road in the Nagykunság (Alföld) region of Hungary, that connects the Main road 4 change to the Main road 44, facilitating access from Szolnok to Kunszentmárton. The road is 43 km long.

The road, as well as all other main roads in Hungary, is managed and maintained by Magyar Közút, state owned company.

Sources

See also

 Roads in Hungary
 Transport in Hungary

External links
 Hungarian Public Road Non-Profit Ltd. (Magyar Közút Nonprofit Zrt.)
 National Infrastructure Developer Ltd.

Main roads in Hungary
Transport in Jász-Nagykun-Szolnok County